San Huan may refer to:
 3rd Ring Road, a city ring road that encircles the centre of the city of Beijing.
 Three Huans, three noble families during the Spring and Autumn period in the Chinese history.
 Guangxi Sanhuan, a Chinese ceramics manufacturer.